The 2008–09 FA Vase Final was the 35th final of the Football Association's cup competition for teams at levels 9-11 of the English football league system. The match was contested between Glossop North End, of the North West Counties League Premier Division (level 9), and Whitley Bay, of the Northern League Division 1 (level 9).

Background
With a maximum of 9 rounds needed to reach the Final "the Hillmen" played in every round. They played three away ties and five home matches plus the semi-final round, winning each round without need of a replay and outscored their opponents with 33 goals for and 11 conceded. Their semi final matches against Chalfont St Peter was a fascinating affair. With the first leg drawn 3-3, it was 1 - 1 at the end of 90 mins. In extra time K Lugsden scored with the last kick of extra 30 mins to draw the match 2 - 2 sending it into penalties. Glossop won the shootout with Rick Bailey keeping his nerve, slotting home the seventh taken penalty to decide the sudden death kick 6 - 5. "The Seahorses" on the other hand had a much easier time reaching the final only playing in six of the rounds, receiving a bye into Second Round Proper. They were drawn with two away ties and three home matches, again beating all opponents at a first attempt, and narrowly winning their semi 3 - 2 on aggregate.
It was not Whitley Bays' first visit to Wembley, their last visit was in 2002 when they won the FA Vase Final. In comparison, this was Glossops' first ever visit to the home of football. As could be expected, the town of Glossop was gripped in a Wembley fever.

Match

Details

References

FA Vase Finals
FA Vase Final
FA Vase Final
Events at Wembley Stadium
FA Vase Final 2009